Manidar (also Romanized as Manīdar, Manidir, and Monīdar) is a village in Dasturan Rural District, in the Central District of Joghatai County, Razavi Khorasan Province, Iran. At the 2006 census, its population was 942, in 248 families.

References 

Populated places in Joghatai County